Gewertz is a surname. Notable people with the surname include:

Bruce L. Gewertz (born 1949), American vascular surgeon
Deborah Gewertz (born 1948), American anthropologist
Kenneth A. Gewertz (1934–2006), American politician

See also
Gewirtz